Yumin Abbadini (born 6 May 2001) is an Italian artistic gymnast who won silver medal with the team at the 2022 European Men's Artistic Gymnastics Championships. In October 2022 he won the all-around at the Italian national championships.

References

External links
 

2001 births
Living people
Italian male artistic gymnasts
Sportspeople from Bergamo
21st-century Italian people